Rana Vir Singh is an Indian politician.  He was elected to the Lok Sabha, the lower house of the Parliament of India  as a member of the Indian National Congress.

References

External links
 Official biographical sketch in Parliament of India website

1932 births
Lok Sabha members from Uttar Pradesh
India MPs 1980–1984
India MPs 1984–1989
Indian National Congress politicians
Living people